Nicole Dubilier is a marine microbiologist and director of the Symbiosis Department at the Max Planck Institute for Marine Microbiology since 2013 and a Professor of Microbial Symbioses at the University of Bremen. She is a pioneer in ecological and evolutionary symbiotic relationships between sea animals and their microbial partners inhabiting environments that harbour low nutrient concentrations. She was responsible for the discovery of a new form of symbiosis between two kinds of bacteria and the marine oligochaete Olavius algarvensis.

Career
In 1985, Dubilier obtained her degree in Zoology, Biochemistry and Microbiology and completed her Ph.D. in marine biology at the University of Hamburg with Olav Giere in 1992. During her graduate studies, she found herself dispassionate about her research, often wanting to quit, but her persistence propelled her to the finishline. In 1992, motivated to re-discover the excitement of her field, Dubilier attended a molecular biology summer course taught by Donald Manahan at University of Southern California. Later, from 1993–1995, she experienced her first Post-doc with the guidance of Colleen Cavanaugh on hydrothermal vents chemosynthetic life forms. Two years later, she started her career at the Max Planck Institute for Marine Microbiology (MPI-MM), first as a Postdoc studying the Evolution of bacterial symbiosis in gutless worms (1997–2001) and afterwards as the Coordinator of the MPI-MM International Research Program (2002–2017), Head of the Symbiosis Laboratory (2001–2017) and the Head of the Symbiosis Department (since 2013). Dubilier has continued her work on symbiotic relationships within chemosynthetic living organisms, expanding her exploration of both shallow and deep-sea environments, ranging from seagrass to coastal sediments, through meta-omic approaches,  e.g. metaproteomics and metagenomics. Her primary animal models constitute of shrimp, gutless-worms, nematodes, and ciliates.

Awards and honors 
2009 Gordon Research Conference (GRC) Applied and Environmental Microbiology chapter.
2013 Gordon and Betty Moore Foundation Marine Microbiology Initiative Award.
2014 German Research Foundation Gottfried Wilhelm Leibniz Prize.
2017 Co-Chair American Society Microbiology Microbe Conference.
2018 Elected member of EMBO (European Molecular Biology Organization)
2019 Plymouth Marine Science Medal Lecture
2020 Excellence Professor Award of the Petersen Foundation
Since 2013 Elected member at the American Academy of Microbiology.
Since 2020 President of the International Society of Microbial Ecology

Selected publications 

 </ref>

References

External links 
 

Year of birth missing (living people)
Living people
American microbiologists
Academic staff of the University of Bremen
University of Hamburg alumni
American women biologists
Women microbiologists
American women academics
21st-century American women
Max Planck Institute directors